The Romaine-2 Generating Station is a 640 MW hydroelectric generating station on the Romaine River in the Côte-Nord region of the province of Quebec, Canada. It is owned and operated by Hydro-Québec.

Description

It is in the unorganized territory of Lac-Jérôme in the Minganie Regional County Municipality.
It is a concrete gravity dam on a foundation of treated rock.
The lower part of the Abbé Huard River now forms the northeast arm of the Romaine-2 reservoir.

In addition to the main dam, which includes the spillway, the river is contained by dykes A2, B2 and C2 above the dam, and by dykes D2, E2 and F2 below the dam.
Five of the dykes contain asphalt/concrete waterproof cores.

The penstock leads from an intake structure just north of Dyke D2 in a southeast direction to the generating station.
The water passes through a surge chamber, down conduits to the turbines and out through the tailrace to the river to the east of the station.
The station has installed capacity of 640 MW, making it the most powerful of the Romaine complex.
The plant provides 3.3 TWh annually, at a utilization factor of 0.58.

History

The dams and generating station are part of a huge hydroelectric complex with four dams that was launched in 2009 under the government of Jean Charest.
The overall Romaine project was formally launched by Jean Charest in May 2009.
A  road was built to provide access to the four dams.
Construction of Romaine-2 lasted from November 2009 to November 2014.
The generating station came into service in 2014.
In September 2017 Hydro-Québec had said it had no plans for more dams due to the present surplus of electricity.
During the inauguration of Romaine-3 in October 2017, Quebec premier Philippe Couillard confirmed that no more major projects were planned.

Controversies

The company had to negotiate several agreements with the local Innu communities, paying more than CDN$200 million over a 60-year period to compensate for the effects of the dams, roads and electric transmission lines.

There were a number of controversies.
In March 2012 Quebec Route 138 was blocked at Maliotenam by the Innu, who were demanding compensation for the power lines on their territory.
In June 2015 Route 138 was blocked at Pessamit and Maliotenam, and the access road to the construction site was blocked, by construction workers demanding that more local workers be hired.
In July 2015 the road to the site was blocked by the Innu of Natashquan who felt that Hydro-Quebec did not respect the agreement signed in 2008.
In March 2016 a court rejected the demand by Innu families of Uashat mak Mani-utenam to stop the project.
In November 2016 there was controversy over the waste of wood cut in the reservoirs.

Notes

Sources

Dams in Quebec
Minganie Regional County Municipality
Dams completed in 2014
Energy infrastructure completed in 2014